The 2003 European Cup was the 24th edition of the European Cup of athletics.

The Super League Finals were held in Florence, Italy.

Super League

Held on 21 and 22 June in Florence, Italy

Team standings

Top six teams qualified for the 2004 European Indoor Cup.

Results summary

Men's events

Women's events

First League
The First League was held on 21 and 22 June

Men

Group A
Held in Lappeenranta, Finland

Group B
Held in Velenje, Slovenia

Women

Group A
Held in Lappeenranta, Finland

Group B
Held in Velenje, Slovenia

The winners of each group also qualified for the 2004 European Indoor Cup.

Second League
The Second League was held on 21 and 22 June

Men

Group A
Held in Århus, Denmark

Group B
Held in Istanbul, Turkey

Women

Group A
Held in Århus, Denmark

Group B
Held in Istanbul, Turkey

See also
2003 European Athletics Indoor Cup

References

External links
European Cup results (Men) from GBR Athletics
European Cup results (Women) from GBR Athletics

European Cup (athletics)
European Cup
2003 in Italian sport
International athletics competitions hosted by Italy